Nanomedicine is the medical application of nanotechnology.

Nanomedicine may also refer to:

Nanomedicine (Elsevier journal), with the ISO 4 abbreviation Nanomedicine, established in 2005 and published by Elsevier;also known as Nanomedicine: Nanotechnology, Biology and Medicine.
Nanomedicine (Future Medicine journal), with the ISO 4 abbreviation Nanomedicine (Lond.), established in 2006 and published by Future Medicine